Kunte is a surname. Notable people with the surname include:

Abhijit Kunte (born 1977), Indian chess player
Mrunalini Kunte (born 1973), Indian chess player
Nanasaheb Kunte, Indian politician
Nishigandha Kunte (born 1992), Indian model
Prabhakar Kashinath Kunte, (1922–2012), Indian politician
Sitaram Kunte (born 1961), Indian civil servant